Between a Rock & a Hyde Place:  The Best of Payola$ is a greatest hits album by the Payola$, released in 1987 after A&M had dropped the Payola$ from the label, and after the band had rebranded themselves as Rock and Hyde and released Under the Volcano through Capitol/EMI.

Track listing

All songs by Bob Rock and Paul Hyde except as indicated

Side One

"China Boys" – 3:19
"In a Place Like This" – 3:56 (P.Hyde)
"Soldier" – 4:15
"Romance" – 3:33
"Eyes of a Stranger" – 4:54
"I'll Find Another (Who Can Do It Right)" – 3:37

Side Two

"Where Is this Love" – 5:54
"Never Said I Loved You" – 3:18
"Stuck in the Rain" – 3:50
"You're the Only Love" – 4:08 (B.Rock/D.Foster/P.Hyde/M.Nelson)
"It Must Be Love" – 4:38 (B.Rock/P.Hyde/M.Nelson)
"Here's the World" – 4:27 (B.Rock/D.Foster/P.Hyde/M.Nelson)

External links
 

Payolas albums
1987 greatest hits albums
A&M Records compilation albums